One Mission may refer to:
 One Mission (Capleton album), 1999
 One Mission (Sherman Chung album), 2010